William Gilbert Mair, (20 November 1832 – 8 July 1912), was a soldier, resident magistrate, and judge of the Native Land Court in early New Zealand.

Born at the Bay of Islands, he was the son of one of the earliest European settlers, trader Gilbert Mair. He married Jane Cathcart Black at Auckland on 15 May 1872.

At the outbreak of the Waikato War he joined the Colonial Defence Force, and took part in the fighting round Pukekohe and Rangiriri. He later reached the rank of Major in the New Zealand Militia, and took part in campaigns against the Hauhau and Te Kooti.

In 1869 he was a member of the expedition lead by Colonel George Whitmore into Te Urewera, by way of Fort Galatea and the Ahikareru Valley.

His brother was Captain Gilbert Mair, who also participated in Te Kooti's War.

References

1832 births
1912 deaths
New Zealand people of Scottish descent
Settlers of New Zealand
19th-century New Zealand military personnel
19th-century New Zealand judges